Shaandaar is a 2015 Indian Hindi-language romantic comedy film directed by Vikas Bahl and produced by Anurag Kashyap and Vikramaditya Motwane. It stars Shahid Kapoor and Alia Bhatt in lead roles, with Pankaj Kapur and Sanjay Kapoor in supporting roles. Principal photography began in August 2014 in Leeds, and the film released on 22 October 2015.

Plot
Alia Arora is an insomniac orphan adopted by Bipin Arora, whose wife Geetu Arora and mother Kamla Arora are extremely business minded and greedy. Alia is ignored by both Geetu and Kamla, but deeply loved by Bipin, as well as his biological daughter Isha. Since Alia is unable to sleep, Bipin draws her a dream every night before going to bed, hoping it will encourage her to sleep.

With Isha set to get married at a destination wedding in London, the family drives to the wedding venue. On the way, Bipin's car is hit by Jagjinder Joginder aka JJ driving his motorcycle, leading to a comical altercation between them. It is later revealed that JJ is the event manager for Isha's wedding. The marriage is arranged between the Aroras and the Fundwanis, a family headed by Mr. Fundwani. The Aroras need the marriage to occur as they have become bankrupt, and are hoping to access the money of the seemingly wealthy Fundwanis. The groom, Robin Fundwani, is fitness-obsessed and vain; he looks at Isha with contempt because of her weight and her love of food. It is evident that he was getting married only at the behest of his older brother.

Through some magical and funny moments, Alia and JJ (who is also an insomniac due to losing his parents in anti-Sikh riots) become romantically interested in one another, eventually curing each other's insomnia and falling asleep together. Bipin who is very protective of Alia tries to separate the couple leading to several comic moments, and this leads to him inadvertently revealing that Alia is his biological daughter with his ex-girlfriend, whom he briefly dated before marrying Geetu under family pressure. Under the coaxing of Isha and after observing the couple, Bipin begins to slowly accept JJ and Alia's relationship.

Isha becomes increasingly upset with Robin, with Robin escalating this friction by insulting Isha's weight and making fun of her. Although the Aroras are bothered by Robin's treatment of Isha, they turn a blind eye to it to avoid any disruptions to their business deal with the Fundwanis. Before the wedding, Arora matriarch Kamla, during an argument with her younger son, sneezes and dies, which threatens to derail the wedding. The Aroras, desperate for the wedding to carry on, pretend she is still alive.

Isha arrives at the wedding dais ready to marry Robin for her family's sake. But when Robin begins to laugh at her after her dress rips during the ceremony, she decides not to get married, and her speech inspires every one to believe in themselves and their self-worth. Frustrated, Mr. Fundwani tries to physically force the marriage to continue by holding everyone at gunpoint, and it is revealed that the Fundwanis are also bankrupt. JJ, Alia, Bipin, Isha and Robin escape from the scene and fly away in a helicopter.

Cast
Shahid Kapoor as Jagjinder Joginder (JJ)
Alia Bhatt as Alia Arora
Sanah Kapur as Isha Arora
Vikas Verma as Robin Fundwani
Shibani Dandekar as Sonia
Pankaj Kapur as Bipin Arora
Sanjay Kapoor as Mr. Fundwani
Anjana Sukhani as Mrs. Fundwani
Niki Aneja Walia as Geetu Arora
Sushma Seth as Kamla Arora
Tessa Vellara and Teena Vellara as the Twins
Shalini Chandran as Relative
 Hagupreet Singh as Robin's friend
 Kumud Pant as Business Wedding Guest
Karan Johar as himself who host his show Mehendi with Karan (cameo appearance)

Critical reception
Deepanjana Pal at Firstpost described the writing as sloppy, commenting that, "it's more a series of YouTube sketches than a proper story." Indian Express felt that Kapoor's character Jagjinder Joginder was "badly-written", noting, "He can be such a natural charmer, but here the charm offensive is not allowed to stop, and finally just overtakes him." Saibal Chatterjee of NDTV, felt that while there were "flashes of smart writing", that there was also "[a lack] of sustained narrative force, especially in the second half". Chatterjee described the interaction between Kapoor and Bhatt as "spontaneous chemistry", an opinion that was not shared by the Indian Express reviewer, who wrote, "Shahid and Alia look good together, but there's not very much else they manage between the two of them."

Ibnlive described the movie as "The film is bizarre and wildly inconsistent". India TV stated "There is nothing Shaandaar about this Shahid-Alia starrer". TimesofIndia gave two stars to the film.

Soundtrack

The music and background score for the film is composed by Amit Trivedi. The first song titled, "Gulaabo" was released on 10 September 2015, followed by "Shaam Shaandaar" which was released on 16 September 2015. The music rights for the film have been acquired by Zee Music Company. The full audio album was released on 24 September 2015.

Box office
The film was declared as a box-office failure after a full run in theatres. The success of Pyaar Ka Punchnama 2 was considered to add to the film's failure.

References

External links
 

Films about Indian weddings
Films shot in England
2010s Hindi-language films
2015 films
Indian romantic comedy films
2015 romantic comedy films
Films scored by Amit Trivedi
Films scored by Mikey McCleary
Fox Star Studios films
Indian films with live action and animation
Films directed by Vikas Bahl